Events in the year 2022 in Austria.

Incumbents 
 President: Alexander Van der Bellen
 Chancellor: Karl Nehammer

Governors 
 Burgenland: Hans Peter Doskozil
 Carinthia: Peter Kaiser
 Lower Austria: Johanna Mikl-Leitner
 Salzburg: Wilfried Haslauer Jr.
 Styria: Hermann Schützenhöfer
 Tyrol: Günther Platter
 Upper Austria: Thomas Stelzer
 Vienna: Michael Ludwig
 Vorarlberg: Markus Wallner

Events 
 1 January – Austria legalizes assisted suicide for people over the age of 18 years who are terminally ill or who suffer from a permanent, debilitating condition.
 20 January – The Austrian National Council votes 137–13 to approve a bill requiring people over 18 years to receive the COVID-19 vaccine beginning on 1 February, becoming the first country in the European Union to do so.
 28 February –Diplomats from the U.S., United Kingdom, France, Germany, Russia, China, and Iran gather in Vienna, Austria to seek a deal to revive the 2015 Iran deal.
 9 May – Münchendorf derailment
 22 May – Austria confirms its first case of monkeypox.
 18 August – 2022 European derecho: Five people are killed by storms in Austria.
25 September – The 2022 Tyrolean state election was held.
 9 October – 2022 Austrian presidential election: Incumbent president Alexander van der Bellen secures reelection after receiving more than 50% of the votes.
8 December – Austria announces that it will veto Bulgaria and Romania's accession to the Schengen Area, citing fears of increased illegal immigration.
25 December – At least four people are injured, one of them seriously, when an avalanche hits the ski resort Zürs/Lech in Vorarlberg, Austria. Emergency services rescue all of the ten people who had been buried alive.

Deaths 
9 February – Joseph Horovitz, composer (Captain Noah and His Floating Zoo) and conductor (b. 1926).
17 December – Albert Reichmann, Austrian-Canadian real estate executive (b. 1929)

References 

 
Austria
Austria
2020s in Austria
Years of the 21st century in Austria